Terminalia nigrovenulosa  is a species of tree in the family Combretaceae. It is distributed in China, Indo-China, and peninsular Malaysia.

References

nigrovenulosa
Flora of Indo-China
Trees of Vietnam